Matthias Buchinger (June 2, 1674 – January 17, 1740), sometimes called Matthew Buckinger in English, was a German artist, magician, calligrapher, and performer who was born without hands or feet and was 2'5" (74 cm.) tall. Buchinger was especially noted for his micrography, in which illustrations consist of very small text.

Biography
Buchinger was born in Ansbach, Germany, without hands or lower legs. An artist and performer, he "traveled all over Northern Europe to entertain kings and aristocrats as well as hoi polloi with amazing feats of physical dexterity" and was known as “The Greatest German Living” and "Little Man from Nuremberg". He travelled to England trying to get a court appointment with King George I; unsuccessful, he then moved to Ireland where he gave public demonstrations, in Dublin in 1720 and in Belfast in 1722. He also is rumored to have had children by as many as 70 mistresses. Buchinger's fame was so widespread that in the 1780s the term "Buckinger's boot" existed in England as a euphemism for the vagina (because the only "limb" he had was his penis). Buchinger died in Cork, Ireland.

Despite his having small, finlike appendages for hands, his engravings were incredibly detailed. One such engraving, a self-portrait, was so detailed that a close examination of the curls of his hair revealed that they were in fact seven biblical psalms and the Lord's Prayer, inscribed in miniature letters.

Despite his handicap Buchinger was an accomplished magician, causing balls to disappear from under cups and birds to appear from nowhere. It also was said that he was unbeatable at cards and would dazzle audiences with his amazing displays of marksmanship. Buchinger liked to build ships in a bottle. He had tremendous dexterity, in spite of his disability.

Buchinger's musical skills included the ability to play a half-dozen musical instruments including the dulcimer, hautboy, trumpet, and flute and several of his own invention.

Family 
Buchinger was married four times and had at least 14 children. These fourteen children were birthed by eight women.

Legacy 
The Metropolitan Museum of Art presented 16 of his graphic works in a historical show entitled, “Wordplay: Matthias Buchinger’s Drawings From the Collection of Ricky Jay”. Jay, a magician and "collector of antique marvels", tracked down Buchinger's works for more than 30 years. He chronicled his pursuit of all things Buchinger in a book called Matthias Buchinger: ‘The Greatest German Living’ by Ricky Jay, Whose Peregrinations in Search of the ‘Little Man of Nuremberg’ Are Herein Revealed.

See also
 Micrography
Phocomelia

References

Further reading

Randi, James. Conjuring. (1992) 
Blaine, David. Mysterious Stranger. (2002) 

1674 births
1740 deaths
German people with disabilities
German calligraphers
German magicians
Mouth and foot painting artists
People with phocomelia